Cartoon Noir is a 1999 feature film anthology film consisting of six animated short subjects from five countries.  The short films brought together for this anthology were Gentle Spirit (1987) by Polish animator Piotr Dumala, Club of the Laid Off (1989) by the Czech artist Jiří Barta, Abductees (1995) from England’s Paul Vester, The Story of the Cat and the Moon (1995) from Portuguese animator Pedro Serrazina, and a pair of shorts from American filmmakers: Suzan Pitt's Joy Street (1996) and Julie Zammarchi's Ape (1992).

Cartoon Noir was released on DVD in 2000.

References

External links
Cartoon Noir in the Internet Movie Database
Review, The New York Times

1999 films
1999 animated films
Animated anthology films
1990s animated short films